David Elliot may refer to:

 David Elliot (illustrator) (born 1952), New Zealand illustrator
 David Elliot (footballer) (born 1969), Scottish former footballer
 David Elliot (actor) (born 1981), Scottish actor

See also 
 David Elliott (disambiguation)